Uniper SE [ˈjuːnipɚ] is an energy company based in Düsseldorf, Germany. The name of the company is a portmanteau of "unique" and "performance"  given by long-term employee Gregor Recke. Uniper was formed by the separation of E.ON's fossil fuel assets into a separate company that began operating on 1 January 2016. The company employs about 11,000 employees in over 40 countries. Around one third of the employees are based in Germany. It owns a subsidiary company in Russia called Unipro. Uniper is listed at the Frankfurt Stock Exchange.

The company has faced criticism for opening new coal-fueled power plants in Germany as recently as May 2020. Uniper was one of the financiers of the Nord Stream 2 project, which the German government suspended after the 2022 Russian invasion of Ukraine.

History
The split of the majority of E.ON's 'upstream' electricity generation business from its 'downstream' retail and distribution business was first announced in April 2015. The company became active on 1 January 2016, with 14,000 employees and is expecting an operating profit (EBITDA) of €4billion. Arranged below Uniper SE were the Uniper Beteiligungs GmbH and the Uniper Holding GmbH, the latter functioning as holding company for the operative companies such as the Uniper Kraftwerke GmbH. The only nuclear plants in Uniper are Swedish, because German government rules aim to stop companies avoiding nuclear clean-up costs.

In June 2016, the shareholders' meetings of E.ON SE and Uniper SE decided to spin off Uniper from E.ON. It took place through a retrospective transfer of Uniper's business to 195 million new shares created by an increase in noncash capital as of January 1, 2016. It was intended to deconsolidate Uniper from E.ON in the first half of 2017. E.ON sold a 53% stake in the business through a listing on the Frankfurt Stock Exchange on 12 September 2016.

In November 2017, Uniper completed the sale of its stake on the Russian gas field Yuzhno-Russkoye. The Uniper share of 25% was sold for €1.749 billion plus the transferred liquid funds to the Austrian OMV Group.

In September 2017, Finnish power company Fortum announced it would buy E.ON's remaining 47% stake in Uniper and make a bid for the other 53% held by other shareholders, valuing Uniper at €8 billion. A takeover bid  was submitted on 7 November 2017. E.ON accepted the offer on 8 January 2018.  Fortum acquired in total a 47.35% stake. The deal was completed on 26 June 2018, after approval by various authorities. As of August 18, 2020, Fortum held a 75.01% stake in Uniper.

On 4 July 2019, Uniper and EPH ("Energetický a průmyslový holding a.s.") signed the agreements for the sale of Uniper's activities in France. The scope of transaction includes Uniper's French sales business, two gas-fired power plants in Saint-Avold (Lorraine), two coal-fired power plants in Saint-Avold and Gardanne (Provence), the biomass power plant "Provence 4 Biomasse" in Gardanne and wind and solar power plants.

Uniper announced on 28 April 2022 that it will pay for Russian gas in roubles giving in to Russian demands and helping to undercut EU sanctions on Russia.

In July 2022, the German government and Fortum agreed to bailout Uniper a €15 billion rescue deal after being severely affected by reduced supplies and high prices following the energy standoff with Russia. Germany agreed to pay €267million for a stake in the ownership of Uniper, while also offering the firm up to €7.7billion in financing. Under the bailout, a record in German corporate history, the government will take a 30% stake in Uniper, reducing the ownership of Fortum to 56%.

On 20 September 2022, Bloomberg News reported that the German government intended to nationalize the company, purchasing the remainder of Fortum's stake and becoming Uniper's sole owner. News of the transaction caused Uniper shares to decline and a sharp spike in Fortum's share price, resulting in a halt in trading of the latter. Finland's Minister of Ownership Steering Tytti Tuppurainen stated that Finland would not accept the nationalisation of Uniper without a level of compensation being paid. The German government's intention to nationalize the company was formalized the next day. Germany will spend $8 billion to acquire a 99% stake in the company. Uniper published a €40b loss for the first 3 quarters of 2022.

Operations
Uniper operates in the EU countries Germany, Sweden, the Netherlands, Belgium and Hungary. Outside of the EU it operates in Russia, the United Kingdom, and has offices in the United States, Azerbaijan, Singapore, and the United Arab Emirates. In addition to the fossil fuel power generation assets it owns hydropower and nuclear power assets in Sweden. Together, Fortum and Uniper are running the Oskarshamn nuclear power plant and are both involved in the Forsmark nuclear power plant. Both operate hydropower plants in Sweden.

With 34 GW generating capacities Uniper is one of the largest European electricity producers. Uniper Global Commodities SE trades at the spot and futures market for gas, coal, freight, oil, liquefied natural gas and emission rights on different stock markets and on the over-the-counter-market. Uniper Energy Storage GmbH is responsible for gas storage activities in Europe. The Power-to-Gas plants WindGas Falkenhagen and WindGas Hamburg store renewable energy in the form of electricity, gas or heat. Through electrolyze the gained wind energy is transformed in hydrogen and fed in the local gas network.

List of Power Stations of Uniper outside Germany (for Power Stations in Germany see :de:Uniper Kraftwerke):

In addition, Uniper owns more than 70 hydropower plants with a capacity of 1,553 MW in Sweden.

According to the 2017 Sustainability Report, the power production (totalling 120.8 TWh in 2017) by primary energy source was:

Corporate affairs 
The CEO of the company is Klaus-Dieter Maubach. Tiina Tuomela is chief financial officer (CFO). Niek den Hollander is the chief commercial officer (CCO) for commercial activities and David Bryson the chief operating officer (COO). The supervisory board consist of twelve members. Six members have been appointed by the general meeting, six by the employees through an election set up by Uniper SE. The shareholder representatives are Markus Rauramo (Chairman), Dr. Bernhard Günther (Deputy Chairman), Prof. Dr. Werner Brinker, Judith Buss, Esa Hyvärinen and Nora Steiner-Forsberg. The employee representatives are Harald Seegatz (deputy chairman), Holger Grzella, Diana Kirschner, Victoria Kulambi, Magnus Notini and Immo Schlepper.

In January 2023 Uniper announced that Klaus-Dieter Maubach used his right of cancellation and would quit as CEO in March that year. Additionally COO David Bryson and CFO Tiina Tuomela made their resignations public. On 1 March 2023 Michael Lewis, former CEO of E.ON UK, was appointed as new Uniper CEO.

References

External links 

 

 
Electric power companies of Germany
Natural gas companies of Germany
Energy companies established in 2016
Nuclear power companies
2016 initial public offerings
Multinational companies headquartered in Germany
Companies in the MDAX